Cuta may refer to:

People
 Cidália Cuta (born 1998), Mozambican football player also known as Ninika

Places
 Cuța, Socond, Romania

Other
 Canadian Urban Transit Association